The Order of Glory or Sharaf Order is a state distinction and award of the Republic of Tajikistan. It is awarded to people for their services to the development of the economy, social sphere, science, culture and education, exemplary state and military service and fruitful public activity. The Order of Honor has two degrees:

 1st degree, which is hung with a ribbon on the left side of the chest
 2nd degree, which is hung with a ribbon on the left side of the chest.

Recipients 

 Sirodjidin Aslov (2010)

 Dilshod Nazarov (2015 and 2016)
 Ramil Nadyrov
 Ozoda Rahmon (2015)
Rajabali Rahmonali
 Rahmonali Safaralizoda

 Vladimir Anatolyevich Yakovlev

References 

Orders, decorations, and medals of Tajikistan